Czesława Helena Kościańska-Szczepińska (born 22 May 1959 in Tczew) is a Polish rower.

External links 
 
 
 
 

1959 births
Living people
Polish female rowers
People from Tczew
Rowers at the 1980 Summer Olympics
Rowers at the 1988 Summer Olympics
Olympic silver medalists for Poland
Olympic rowers of Poland
Olympic medalists in rowing
Sportspeople from Pomeranian Voivodeship
World Rowing Championships medalists for Poland
Medalists at the 1980 Summer Olympics